An Geon-hyeong (Hangul:안건형) (born Nov 15, 2000) is a South Korean figure skater. He is the 2017 Asian Trophy bronze medalist. He competed in the free skating at the 2018 Four Continents Championships.

Career

Early career
An started skating in 2008 at his hometown, Daegu.

Career

In August 2015, An placed 3rd at the Korean selection competition with a score 157.15, which guaranteed two Junior Grand Prix events for him. He debuted at the ISU Junior Grand Prix circuit in Slovakia, where he placed 11th, and in Austria, where he placed 12th.

In the 2016/17 season, An finished 6th at the 2017 South Korean Figure Skating Championships.

In September 2017, An placed 3rd at the Asian Figure Skating Trophy, and went on to place 17th and 10th at his Junior Grand Prix assignments in Austria and Croatia for the 2017/18 season. He placed 7th at the 2018 South Korean Figure Skating Championships and was named an alternate to, and was eventually called up to compete at the 2018 Four Continents Figure Skating Championships, where he finished 20th.

Programs

Competitive highlights
JGP = Junior Grand Prix

Detailed results

Junior level

 Personal best highlighted in bold.

References

External links
 

2000 births
Living people
South Korean male single skaters
Sportspeople from Daegu
21st-century South Korean people